Midway is an unincorporated community in Henry County, Tennessee, United States. Barrs Chapel C.M.E. Church, which is listed on the National Register of Historic Places, is located in Midway.

References

Unincorporated communities in Henry County, Tennessee
Unincorporated communities in Tennessee